The 2016 Jacob Companies 200 was the 5th stock car race of the 2016 NASCAR Camping World Truck Series, and the 17th iteration of the event. The race was held on Friday, May 13, 2016, in Dover, Delaware at Dover International Speedway, a 1-mile (1.6 km) permanent oval-shaped racetrack. The race took the scheduled 200 laps to complete. Matt Crafton, driving for ThorSport Racing, held off Daniel Suárez in the final 28 laps for his 12th career NASCAR Camping World Truck Series win, and his first of the season. To fill out the podium, Christopher Bell, driving for Kyle Busch Motorsports, would finish in 3rd, respectively.

Background 

Dover International Speedway is a race track in Dover, Delaware. The track has hosted at least one NASCAR Cup Series race each year since 1969, including two per year from 1971 to 2020. In addition to NASCAR, the track also hosted USAC and the Indy Racing League. The track features one layout, a  concrete oval, with 24° banking in the turns and 9° banking on the straights. The speedway is owned and operated by Speedway Motorsports.

The track, nicknamed "The Monster Mile", was built in 1969 by Melvin Joseph of Melvin L. Joseph Construction Company, Inc., with an asphalt surface, but was replaced with concrete in 1995. Six years later in 2001, the track's capacity increased to 135,000 seats, giving the track the largest seating capacity of any sports venue in the mid-Atlantic region. In 2002, the name changed to Dover International Speedway from Dover Downs International Speedway after Dover Downs Gaming and Entertainment split, making Dover Motorsports. From 2007 to 2009, the speedway worked on an improvement project called "The Monster Makeover", which expanded facilities at the track and beautified the track. Depending on configuration, the track's capacity is at 95,500 seats. Its grand total maximum capacity was at 135,000 spectators.

Entry list 

 (R) denotes rookie driver.
 (i) denotes driver who is ineligible for series driver points.

Practice

First practice 
The first practice session was held on Thursday, May 12, at 2:00 pm EST, and would last for 55 minutes.

Final practice 
The final practice session was held on Thursday, May 12, at 4:00 pm EST, and would last for 55 minutes.

Qualifying 
Qualifying was originally going to be held on Friday, May 13, at 2:15 pm EST. Since Dover International Speedway is under 1.5 miles (2.4 km) in length, the qualifying system was a multi-car system that included three rounds. The first round was 15 minutes, where every driver would be able to set a lap within the 15 minutes. Then, the second round would consist of the fastest 24 cars in Round 1, and drivers would have 10 minutes to set a lap. Round 3 consisted of the fastest 12 drivers from Round 2, and the drivers would have 5 minutes to set a time. Whoever was fastest in Round 3 would win the pole.

Qualifying would be cancelled due to inclement weather. The starting lineup would be determined by speeds in first practice. As a result, William Byron, driving for Kyle Busch Motorsports would earn the pole.

Austin Cindric and Norm Benning would fail to qualify.

Starting lineup

Race results

Standings after the race 

Drivers' Championship standings

Note: Only the first 8 positions are included for the driver standings.

References 

NASCAR races at Dover Motor Speedway
May 2016 sports events in the United States
2016 in sports in Delaware